Nirmala Sitharaman (born 18 August 1959) is an Indian economist and politician serving as the Minister of Finance and Corporate Affairs of India since 2019. She is a member of the Rajya Sabha, upper house of the Indian Parliament, since 2014. Sitharaman previously served as the Defence Minister of India, thereby becoming India's second female defence minister and the second female finance minister after Indira Gandhi, and the first full-time female minister to hold each of those portfolios. She has served as the Minister of State for Finance and Corporate Affairs under the Ministry of Finance and the Minister for Commerce and Industry with independent charge. Prior to that, she served as a national spokesperson for the Bharatiya Janata Party.

Sitharaman featured in the Forbes 2022 list of World's 100 most powerful women and was ranked 36. Fortune ranked Nirmala Sitharaman as the most powerful woman in India.

Early life
Nirmala Sitharaman was born in a Tamil Iyengar family in Madurai, Tamil Nadu, to Savitri and Narayanan Sitharaman. She had her schooling from Madras and Tiruchirappalli. She obtained a Bachelor of Arts degree in economics at the Seethalakshmi Ramaswami College, Tiruchirapalli in 1980, Master of Arts degree in economics and M.Phil. from Jawaharlal Nehru University, Delhi in 1984. She then enrolled for a Ph.D. program in Economics with a focus on Indo-Europe trade; but later left this program and moved to London (when her husband secured a scholarship in London School of Economics) because of which she was unable to complete her degree.

Political career
Sitharaman joined the BJP in 2006 and was appointed in 2010 as a spokesperson for the party. In 2014, she was inducted into Narendra Modi's cabinet as a junior minister and was elected in June of that year as a Rajya Sabha Member from Andhra Pradesh.

In May 2016, she was one of the 12 candidates nominated by the BJP to contest the Rajya Sabha elections due on 11 June. She successfully contested her seat from Karnataka.

She has served as the Defence Minister of India and headed the Balakot Air Strike carried out by the Indian Air Force in 2019. She is currently serving as the Minister of Finance and Corporate affairs of India and has presented five annual budgets of India. India reached the mark of a $3.1 trillion economy under her leadership.

Union Cabinet Minister

Union Defence Minister

On 3 September 2017, she was appointed as Minister of Defence, being only the second woman after Indira Gandhi to hold the post, but the first full-time female defence minister.

Union Finance Minister

On 31 May 2019, Nirmala Sitharaman was appointed as the finance and corporate affairs minister. She is India's first full-time female finance minister. She presented her maiden budget in the Indian parliament on 5 July 2019. Sitharaman presented the Union Budget 2020–21 on 1 February 2020. During the COVID-19 pandemic in India she was made in-charge of the COVID-19 Economic Response Task Force.

Non-political career
Nirmala Sitharaman worked as a salesperson at Habitat, a home decor store in London's Regent Street. She has served as an assistant to Economist in the Agricultural Engineers Association in the UK. During her stay in the UK, she has also served as a Senior Manager (R&D) for PWC and briefly at the BBC World Service.

She has also served as a member of National Commission for Women. In 2017, she was one of the founding directors of Pranava in Hyderabad.

Awards and honors 
The Jawaharlal Nehru University conferred her the Distinguished Alumni Award in 2019. Forbes Magazine has ranked her 34th among the 100 most powerful women in the world in 2019.

Personal life
Sitharaman met her husband Parakala Prabhakar who is from Narsapuram, Andhra Pradesh, while studying at the Jawaharlal Nehru University. While Nirmala leaned towards the BJP, her husband was from a Congress family. They married in 1986, and have a daughter. Prabhakar served as a communications advisor to the former Chief Minister of Andhra Pradesh.

See also
List of female defence ministers
List of female finance ministers

References

External links
 Elections.in – Nirmala Sitharaman Biography

|-

|-

|-

|-

1959 births
Living people
Politicians from Madurai
Tamil politicians
Indian Tamil politicians
Women in Andhra Pradesh politics
PricewaterhouseCoopers people
Jawaharlal Nehru University alumni
Rajya Sabha members from Andhra Pradesh
Union ministers of state of India with independent charge
Bharatiya Janata Party politicians from Andhra Pradesh
Narendra Modi ministry
21st-century Indian women politicians
21st-century Indian politicians
Women in Karnataka politics
Indian women economists
20th-century Indian economists
Rajya Sabha members from Karnataka
Women union ministers of state of India
Women members of the Rajya Sabha
Union Ministers from Tamil Nadu
Female defence ministers
21st-century Indian economists
Women scientists from Tamil Nadu
Women members of the Cabinet of India
Finance Ministers of India
Defence Ministers of India
Commerce and Industry Ministers of India
Ministers for Corporate Affairs
Female finance ministers